HLA-B53 (B53) is an HLA-B serotype. The serotype identifies the more common HLA-B*53 gene products. The B53 sequence is identical to B35 but short sequence specifies a Bw4 rather than a Bw6 motif (as found in B35), indicating B53 is a recent product of gene conversion. This suggests an origin for HLA-B53 involving a gene conversion of HLA-B35 by an allele containing this Bw4 sequence. (For terminology help see: HLA-serotype tutorial)

Serotype

B*5301 allele frequencies

Haplotype frequencies

Despite its low frequency, the A36-Cw4-B53 haplotype is one of the most common A-Cw-B haplotypes, as it is the 4th most common in African Americans.

References

5